Bryan Goldsby (born March 24, 1982) is an American professional mixed martial arts (MMA) fighter who formerly fought for Bellator Fighting Championships. He currently fights in various promotions across the world and is the current NAAFS Bantamweight Champion.

MMA career
Goldsby made his professional MMA debut in December 2006 and won in just 13 seconds. He holds a notable unanimous decision win over WEC veteran Jeff Curran. He has also fought notable fighters such as UFC and WEC veterans Antonio Banuelos and Will Campuzano.

Bellator Fighting Championships
Goldsby upset WEC veteran Jeff Curran in his Bellator debut. That win earned him a spot in the Bellator Fighting Championships: Season Three Bantamweight Tournament. He lost to Ed West in the Bantamweight Quarterfinals at Bellator 27 on September 2, 2010. Goldsby replaced injured Ulysses Gomez in the semifinals where he fought Zach Makovsky at Bellator 30. Goldsby lost for the second time in the Bellator Bantamweight Tournament to Makovsky who would go on to win the first ever Bellator Bantamweight Championships. At Bellator 52, Goldsby lost his third consecutive fight in the organization to Genair da Silva, and was released from the promotion shortly afterwards.

Titan Fighting Championship
In 2014, Goldsby signed with Titan Fighting Championship. He made his debut against Kevin Croom at Titan FC 27 on February 28, 2014. He lost by unanimous decision.

Other promotions
Goldsby challenged Isaiah Chapman for the NAAFS Bantamweight Championship on March 30, 2013. Goldsby won the championship in the fourth round by TKO (retirement).

Goldsby was expected to face Mark Cherico at Pittsburgh Challenge Series 8 on July 12, 2014, for the PFC Featherweight Championship. However, Goldsby was removed from the bout for unknown reasons and was replaced by Luis Guerra.

Championships and accomplishments
Atlas Fights
Atlas Fights Bantamweight Championship (One time)
Fight Party MMA
FPMMA Featherweight Championship (One time)
North American Allied Fight Series
NAAFS Bantamweight Championship (One time)

Mixed martial arts record

|-
| Loss
| align=center| 17–16
| Kevin Croom
| Decision (unanimous)
| Titan Fighting Championship 27
| 
| align=center| 3
| align=center| 5:00
| Kansas City, Kansas, United States
| 
|-
| Win
| align=center| 17–15
| Isaiah Chapman
| TKO (retirement)
| NAAFS: Caged Vengeance
| 
| align=center| 4
| align=center| 5:00
| Canton, Ohio, United States
| 
|-
| Win
| align=center| 16–15
| Steve Smith
| Decision (unanimous)
| NAAFS: Caged Fury 18
| 
| align=center| 3
| align=center| 5:00
| Charleston, West Virginia, United States
| 
|-
| Win
| align=center| 15–15
| Matt Munsey
| Decision (unanimous)
| Fight Party - Tabernacle Fight Party
| 
| align=center| 3
| align=center| 5:00
| Atlanta, Georgia, United States
| 
|-
| Win
| align=center| 14–15
| Aaron Williams
| TKO (punches)
| Atlas Fights - Cage Rage 10
| 
| align=center| 1
| align=center| 3:53
| Biloxi, Mississippi, United States
| 
|-
| Loss
| align=center| 13–15
| Genair da Silva
| Submission (d'arce choke)
| Bellator 52
| 
| align=center| 1
| align=center| 3:51
| Lake Charles, Louisiana, United States
| 
|-
| Loss
| align=center| 13–14
| Ronnie Rogers
| Submission (guillotine choke)
| Wild Bill's Fight Night 39
| 
| align=center| 1
| align=center| 1:15
| Duluth, Georgia, United States
| 
|-
| Win
| align=center| 13–13
| Aaron Williams
| Decision (unanimous)
| Atlas Fights: Cage Rage 6
| 
| align=center| 3
| align=center| 5:00
| Biloxi, Mississippi, United States
| 
|-
|  Loss
| align=center| 12–13
| Zach Makovsky
| Decision (unanimous)
| Bellator 30
| 
| align=center| 3
| align=center| 5:00
| Louisville, Kentucky, United States
| 
|-
|  Loss
| align=center| 12–12
| Ed West
| Decision (unanimous)
| Bellator 27
| 
| align=center| 3
| align=center| 5:00
| San Antonio, Texas, United States
| 
|-
| Win
| align=center| 12–11
| Jeff Curran
| Decision (unanimous)
| Bellator 14
| 
| align=center| 3
| align=center| 5:00
| Chicago, Illinois, United States
| 
|-
| Loss
| align=center| 11–11
| Jon Queiroz
| Decision (unanimous)
| Clash of the Kings
| 
| align=center| 3
| align=center| 5:00
| Atlanta, Georgia, United States
| 
|-
| Loss
| align=center| 11–10
| Jessie Riggleman
| Decision (split)
| RIE 2: Battle at the Burg 2
| 
| align=center| 3
| align=center| 5:00
| Penn Laird, Virginia, United States
| 
|-
| Win
| align=center| 11–9
| Jonathan Mackles
| TKO (punches)
| Moosin: God of Martial Arts
| 
| align=center| 2
| align=center| 3:51
| Birmingham, Alabama, United States
| 
|-
| Loss
| align=center| 10–9
| Zac George
| Submission (armbar)
| C3: Slammin Jammin Weekend 2
| 
| align=center| 2
| align=center| 2:36
| Red Rock, Oklahoma, United States
| 
|-
| Win
| align=center| 10–8
| Harris Norwood
| Decision (unanimous)
| Clash of the Kings
| 
| align=center| 3
| align=center| 5:00
| Kennesaw, Georgia, United States
| 
|-
| Win
| align=center| 9–8
| David Love
| TKO (punches)
| Extreme Combat International 16
| 
| align=center| 1
| align=center| N/A
| Huntsville, Alabama, United States
| 
|-
| Win
| align=center| 8–8
| Joey Marimberga
| KO (punches)
| Adrenaline MMA 3: Bragging Rights
| 
| align=center| 1
| align=center| 4:57
| Birmingham, Alabama, United States
| 
|-
| Loss
| align=center| 7–8
| Peter Duncan
| Submission (kimura)
| CW 11: Decade
| 
| align=center| 2
| align=center| 4:05
| Belfast, Northern Ireland
| 
|-
| Loss
| align=center| 7–7
| Will Campuzano
| Submission (triangle choke)
| Cage Kings: Total Domination
| 
| align=center| 2
| align=center| 1:32
| Bossier City, Louisiana, United States
| 
|-
| Win
| align=center| 7–6
| Randy Steinke
| Submission (rear-naked choke)
| EFA: Rebels Without a Cause
| 
| align=center| 3
| align=center| 0:24
| Monroe, Louisiana, United States
| 
|-
| Loss
| align=center| 6–6
| Harris Norwood
| Decision (split)
| WBFN 18: Ledbetter vs. Naville
| 
| align=center| 3
| align=center| 5:00
| Duluth, Georgia, United States
| 
|-
| Win
| align=center| 6–5
| Thomas Wagner
| TKO (punches)
| EFA: Caged Fury
| 
| align=center| 1
| align=center| 1:19
| Monroe, Louisiana, United States
| 
|-
| Loss
| align=center| 5–5
| Antonio Banuelos
| KO (punch)
| PFC 10: Explosive
| 
| align=center| 2
| align=center| 0:59
| Lemoore, California, United States
| 
|-
| Win
| align=center| 5–4
| Matt Troyer
| TKO (punches)
| RFL: Proving Ground
| 
| align=center| 2
| align=center| 3:55
| Louisville, Kentucky, United States
| 
|-
| Loss
| align=center| 4–4
| Aaron Williams
| Submission (triangle choke)
| XTC 4: The Irish are Coming
| 
| align=center| 3
| align=center| 5:00
| Mobile, Alabama, United States
| 
|-
| Win
| align=center| 4–3
| Joey Marimberga
| Decision (unanimous)
| Revolution Fight League: Relentless
| 
| align=center| 3
| align=center| 5:00
| Macon, Georgia, United States
| 
|-
| Loss
| align=center| 3–3
| Stephen Bass
| Decision (unanimous)
| Throwdown in Mo-Town
| 
| align=center| 3
| align=center| 5:00
| Moultrie, Georgia, United States
| 
|-
| Win
| align=center| 3–2
| Brock Kerry
| TKO (punches)
| Xtreme Total Combat 3
| 
| align=center| 1
| align=center| N/A
| Mobile, Alabama, United States
| 
|-
| Loss
| align=center| 2–2
| Marcus Brimage
| TKO
| Xtreme Freestyle Fighting 7
| 
| align=center| 2
| align=center| 1:07
| Birmingham, Alabama, United States
| 
|-
| Loss
| align=center| 2–1
| Tony Hervey
| Submission (choke)
| Xtreme Freestyle Fighting 6
| 
| align=center| 1
| align=center| 3:08
| Dalton, Georgia, United States
| 
|-
| Win
| align=center| 2–0
| Chris Crumpton
| TKO
| GFC 1: First Blood
| 
| align=center| 1
| align=center| N/A
| Columbus, Georgia, United States
| 
|-
| Win
| align=center| 1–0
| Paul McAdams
| KO (punches)
| Extreme Combat International 7
| 
| align=center| 1
| align=center| 0:13
| N/A
|

References

External links
 

Living people
American male mixed martial artists
Mixed martial artists from Georgia (U.S. state)
Featherweight mixed martial artists
Bantamweight mixed martial artists
African-American mixed martial artists
1982 births
Sportspeople from Macon, Georgia
21st-century African-American sportspeople
20th-century African-American people